Comparator may refer to

An electrical comparator 
A digital comparator
An optical comparator
The Comparator Hypothesis in the psychology of motivation
a biological comparator system